James Cameron Nelford (born June 28, 1955) is a Canadian professional golfer, who has played on the PGA Tour. He has also been a golf commentator for ESPN.

Nelford was born in Vancouver, British Columbia. He won the 1973 B.C. High School golf Championship and the 1973 B.C. Junior Championship. He attended Brigham Young University, where he played on the varsity golf team on scholarship. Nelford won two All-American selections: 1976 and 1977, both Second Team.

Nelford won the 1975 and 1976 Canadian Amateur Championship, and the 1977 Western Amateur. He turned professional in 1977, and played on the PGA Tour from 1978 to 1988, where his best finish was second at the 1983 Sea Pines Heritage Classic and at the 1984 Bing Crosby Pro-Am (playoff loss to Hale Irwin). He won the World Cup with Dan Halldorson in 1980, and he won one Tournament Players' Series event (a PGA Tour satellite event).

Nelford was seriously injured in a waterskiing accident in September 1985, suffering crippling damage to his right arm when it was badly sliced by the propeller blade. Although he recovered, he was never able to regain his top golf form after that, and gradually lost his playing status on the PGA Tour.

Along with Lorne Rubenstein, Nelford co-authored the 1984 book Seasons in a Golfer's Life, a story of his life in golf. Nelford putts left-handed, but plays all of his other shots right-handed. Since turning age 50, Nelford has appeared in a few Champions Tour events, without achieving notable success.

Nelford was inducted into the Canadian Golf Hall of Fame in 2013.

Amateur wins
1975 Canadian Amateur Championship
1976 Canadian Amateur Championship
1977 Western Amateur

Professional wins (4)
1978 Cacharel World Under-25 Championship
1980 World Cup (team with Dan Halldorson)
1983 Essex International Classic (Canada), British Columbia Open

Playoff record
PGA Tour playoff record (0–1)

Team appearances
Amateur
Commonwealth Tournament (representing Canada): 1975 (winners)
Eisenhower Trophy (representing Canada): 1976

Professional
World Cup (representing Canada): 1979, 1980 (winners)

See also
Fall 1977 PGA Tour Qualifying School graduates
1987 PGA Tour Qualifying School graduates

References

External links

Canadian male golfers
BYU Cougars men's golfers
PGA Tour golfers
Golfing people from British Columbia
Sportspeople from Vancouver
1955 births
Living people